The generalized Lotka–Volterra equations are a set of equations which are more general than either the competitive or predator–prey examples of Lotka–Volterra types.
 They can be used to model direct competition and trophic relationships between an arbitrary number of species.  Their dynamics can be analysed analytically to some extent.  This makes them useful as a theoretical tool for modeling food webs.  However, they lack features of other ecological models such as predator preference and nonlinear functional responses, and they cannot be used to model mutualism without allowing indefinite population growth.

The generalised Lotka-Volterra equations model the dynamics of the populations  of  biological species.  Together, these populations can be considered as a vector .  They are a set of ordinary differential equations given by

where the vector  is given by

Meaning of parameters

The generalised Lotka-Volterra equations can represent competition and predation, depending on the values of the parameters, as described below.  'Generalized’ means that all the combinations of pairs of signs for both species (−/−,−/+,+/-, +/+) are possible.They are less suitable for describing mutualism.

A positive value for  means that species i is able to reproduce in the absence of any other species (for instance, because it is a plant), whereas a negative value means that its population will decline unless the appropriate other species are present (e.g. a herbivore that cannot survive without plants to eat, or a predator that cannot persist without its prey).

The values of the elements of the interaction matrix   represent the relationships between the species. The value of  represents the effect that species j has upon species i. If  is positive but  is negative then species i is considered to be a predator (or parasite) on species j, since i's population grows at j's expense.

Positive values for both  and  would be considered mutualism.  However, this is not often used in practice, because it can make it possible for both species' populations to grow indefinitely.

Indirect negative and positive effects are also possible.  For example, if two predators eat the same prey then they compete indirectly, even though they might not have a direct competition term in the community matrix.

The diagonal terms  are usually taken to be negative (i.e. species i's population has a negative effect on itself). This self-limitation prevents populations from growing indefinitely.

Dynamics and solutions

The generalised Lotka-Volterra equations are capable of a wide variety of dynamics, including limit cycles and chaos as well as point attractors (see Hofbauer and Sigmund).  As with any set of ODEs, fixed points can be found by setting  to 0 for all i, which gives, if no species is extinct, i.e., if   for all ,

This matrix is known as the community matrix and its eigenvalues determine the stability of the fixed point . The fixed point may or may not be stable.
If the fixed point is unstable then there may or may not be a periodic or chaotic attractor for which all the populations remain positive.  In either case there can also be attractors for which some of the populations are zero and others are positive.

 is always a fixed point, corresponding to the absence of all species. For  species, a complete classification of this dynamics, for all sign patterns of above coefficients, is available, which is based upon equivalence to the 3-type replicator equation.

Applications for single trophic communities 
In the case of a single trophic community, the trophic level below the one of the community (e.g. plants for a community of herbivore species), corresponding to the food required for individuals of a species i to thrive, is modeled through a parameter Ki known as the carrying capacity. E.g. suppose a mixture of crops involving S species. In this case  can be thus written in terms of a non-dimensional interaction coefficient  (Fort 2020):.

I. Quantitative prediction of species yields from monoculture and biculture experiments.

II. Early warnings of species crashes

The vulnerability of species richness to several factors like, climate change, habitat fragmentation, resource exploitation, etc., poses a challenge to conservation biologists and agencies working to sustain the ecosystem services. Hence, there is a clear need for early warning indicators of species loss generated from empirical data. 

A recently proposed early warning indicator of such population crashes uses effective estimation of the Lotka-Volterra interaction coefficients  . The idea is that such coefficients can be obtained from spatial distributions of individuals of the different species through Maximum Entropy. This method was tested against the data collected for trees by the  Barro Colorado Island Research Station, comprising eight censuses performed every 5 years from 1981 to 2015.

See also 
 Competitive Lotka–Volterra equations, based on a sigmoidal population curve (i.e., it has a carrying capacity)
 Predator–prey Lotka–Volterra equations, based on exponential population growth (i.e., no limits on reproduction ability).
 Community matrix
 Replicator equation
 Volterra lattice

References

Equations
Population ecology
Community ecology